Japanese liberalism  formed in the nineteenth century as a reaction against traditional society. In the twentieth century 'liberal'  gradually became a synonym for conservative, and today the main conservative party in the country is named Liberal Democratic Party (Jiyu Minshuto). The defunct Democratic Party (Minshuto) was considered in part a centrist-liberal party, as are most parties which derived from it. The liberal character of the Liberal League (Jiyu Rengo) is disputed, as it is also considered to be conservative by some. This article is limited to liberal  parties with substantial support, proved by having had representation in parliament. The sign ⇒ means a reference to another party in that scheme. For inclusion in this scheme it isn't necessary that parties labelled themselves "liberal".

Modern Japanese liberalism 
Liberals in Japan are generally considered united by one major factor: their opposition to changing the post-World War II constitution forbidding the creation of a national military.

Before the 1990s, Japanese liberals did not form a prominent individual political party.
 Japan's left-wing liberalism emerged as a "peace movement" and was largely led by the JSP.
 Until the 1990s, conservative liberalism (right-wing liberalism) in Japan was led by the national-conservative LDP, and they contrasted with left-wing liberalism.

Since the 1990s, most conservative liberals have left the LDP. The JNP and Sakigake are the parties founded by Japanese conservative liberals against the LDP's nationalist project, which now lead to the DPJ-liberalism tradition. Japan's modern liberal party, DPJ, which has been in full swing since the 1990s, was led by moderates of the right-wing LDP and left-wing JSP.

Currently, the LDP has not been considered a liberal party. In the past, liberals in the LDP became opposition forces after leaving the party, so "liberal" generally became a force against "conservative" in Japanese politics in the 21st century. The current DPJ-liberalism tradition is being continued by the CDPJ.

Since Japanese conservatism was influenced by Shinto, Japan's radical liberalism and democratic socialism against it were influenced by Christianity.

As the LDP becomes an increasingly solid conservative party, and the socialist movement that led the traditional anti-LDP camp has lost control in Japan's opposition political camp, gradually shifting from the centre-right "liberal" in the European and Australian sense of the past to the centre-left "liberal" in the American sense. Currently, the LDP is the largest right-wing conservative party in Japan, and the CDPJ is the largest centre-left liberal party in Japan.

Timeline

From Public Society of Patriots until Constitutional Politics Party
 1874: Liberals founded the Public Society of Patriots (Aikoku Koto)
 1881: The Aikoku Koto is continued by the Liberal Party (Jiyu-to)
 1891: The Jiyuto is renamed into Constitutional Liberal Party (Rikken Jiyuto)
 1898: The Constitutional Liberal Party merged with the ⇒ Progressive Party into the Constitutional Politics Party (Kenseito)
 1898: A faction seceded as the ⇒ Constitutional Center Party
 1900: The party is taken over by the oligarchy and renamed into Constitutional Political Friends Association (Rikken Seiyukai)

From Constitutional Progressive Party to Reform Club
 1882: The Constitutional Progressive Party (Rikken Kaishinto) is formed 
 1896: The party is continued by the Progressive Party (Shinpoto)
 1898: The party merged into the Constitutional Politics Party (Kenseito)
 1898: This party fell apart and a faction of the Kenseito formed the Authentic Constitutional Party (Kensei Honto), renamed in 1910 into the Constitutional National Party (Rikken Kokuminto)
 1913: A faction seceded as the ⇒ Constitutional Association of Allies
 1922: The Constitutional National Party is renamed Reform Club (Kakushin Kurabu)
 1920s: The Reform Club merged into the Constitutional Association of Political Friendship

From Constitutional Association of Allies to Constitutional Democratic Party
 1913: A faction of the ⇒ Constitutional National Party formed the Constitutional Association of Allies (Rikken Doshikai), renamed Constitutional Association (Kenseikai) in 1916
 1927: The Constitutional Association merged with the ⇒ Authentic Constitutional Party of Political Friendship into the Constitutional Democratic Party (Rikken Minseito)
 1940: The party is dissolved by the military junta

Authentic Constitutional Party of Political Friendship
 1924: A faction of the Constitutional Association of Political Friendship formed the Authentic Constitutional Party of Political Friendship (Seiyu Honto)
 1927: The party merged into the ⇒ Constitutional Democratic Party

From Renewal Party to Liberal Party (1993)
 In postwar Japan, liberal (リベラル) tendencies did not stand out much among major political parties for more than 40 years. During the Japanese Empire, liberals, including the Constitutional Democratic Party, were swept away by several political parties. The center-right liberal-conservatives (自由保守主義) became the 'leftist faction' of the right-wing conservative Liberal Democratic Party, and the center-left progressive-liberals (革新自由主義) formed the 'rightist faction' within the left-wing Socialist Party.
 1993: A liberal faction of the conservative Liberal Democratic Party (Jiyu-Minshuto) seceded as the Renewal Party (Shinseito)
 1994: The Renewal Party merged with other factions into the New Frontier Party (Shinshinto)
 1997: The New Frontier Party fell apart into many parties, among them since 1998 the Liberal Party (Jiyuto), but also the Good Governance Party (Minseito), the New Fraternity Party (Shinto-Yuai) and the Democratic Reform Party (Minshu-Kaikaku-Rengo)
 2000: Dissidents of the Liberal Party formed the New Conservative Party (Hoshuto)
 2003: The Liberal Party merged into the ⇒ Democratic Party of Japan
 2012: People's Life First split from the Democratic Party of Japan
 2012: People's Life First split into a new Liberal Party and Tomorrow Party of Japan
 2013: Tomorrow Party of Japan dissolved
 2019: Liberal Party merged into DPP

New Party Harbinger
 1993: A liberal faction of the conservative Liberal Democratic Party (Jiyu-Minshuto) seceded as the New Party Harbinger (Shinto Sakigake)
 1996: Most members co-found the ⇒ Democratic Party of Japan
 1998: The party evolved in conservative direction, renamed into Harbinger (Sakigake) and further renamed in 2002 into Green Assembly (Midori No Kaigi)

Democratic Party of Japan (1998–2016)
 1996: Dissidents from the New Party Harbinger and the Social Democratic Party founded the Democratic Party of Japan (1996) (Minshuto)
 1998: The party merged with the Good Governance Party (Minseito), the New Fraternity Party (Shinto-Yuai) and the Democratic Reform Party (Minshu-Kaikaku-Rengo) to form a new, enlarged Democratic Party of Japan (1998) (Minshuto, 民主党)
 2003: The Liberal Party merged into the party
 2016: The Democratic Party of Japan merged with Japan Innovation Party and Vision of Reform to form the Democratic Party (Minshinto, 民進党)

CDP and DPP (2016–present)
 2017: The Constitutional Democratic Party of Japan (Rikken Minshuto, 立憲民主党) is formed as a centre-left social liberal party split from the Democratic Party.
 2018: The remaining Democratic Party merged with Kibō no Tō and form the Democratic Party for the People (Kokumin Minshutō, 国民民主党), which includes liberals and conservatives.
 2020: The majority faction of DPP merged into the new CDP, while the minority faction remain in the DPP.

Liberal leaders

 Yukio Hatoyama – Prime Minister of Japan from 16 September 2009 to 8 June 2010, Leader of the DPJ (1999–2002, 2009–2010)
 Naoto Kan – Prime Minister of Japan from 8 June 2010 to 2 September 2011, Leader of the DPJ (1998–1999, 2002–2004, 2010–2011)
 Yoshihiko Noda – Prime Minister of Japan from 2 September 2011 to 26 December 2012, Leader of the DPJ (2011–2012)
 Yukio Edano – Leader of the Opposition (2017–2021).

Liberal thinkers 
 Fukuzawa Yukichi
 Itagaki Taisuke
 Yukio Ozaki
 Tokuzō Fukuda
 Masao Maruyama

See also
 History of Japan
 Politics of Japan
 List of political parties in Japan
 Mainichi Shimbun
 The Asahi Shimbun
 Chunichi Shimbun
 Non-LDP and non-JCP Coalition
 Kakushin Sētō (progressive political parties)
 Christianity in Japan
 Liberalism in South Korea - This was also influenced by Japanese liberalism during its early formation.

Notes

References

 
Politics of Japan